Sabah FC may refer to:

 Sabah FC (Azerbaijan)
 Sabah F.C. (Malaysia)